Sclerotrema is a genus of fungi in the family Auriculariaceae. The type and only species, Sclerotrema griseobrunnea, produces effused, corticioid basidiocarps (fruit bodies) on wood with a smooth surface. The species was originally described from Russia and is also known from Canada.

Taxonomy
The genus was created as a result of molecular research, based on cladistic analysis of DNA sequences, which showed that Sclerotrema griseobrunnea, previously referred to the genus Exidiopsis, formed its own unrelated and distinct clade.

References

Auriculariales
Agaricomycetes genera
Taxa described in 2017